Lessi is a given name and surname. Notable people with the name include:

 Luigi Lessi, manager of the Italian football club Reggina 1914 (1945–1946)
 Tito Lessi (1858–1917), Italian painter
 Lessi Peter-Vigboro, Miss Nigeria 2015
 nickname of Alessia Russo (born 1999), English footballer